Candemir is a Turkish given name for males and a surname. The name is composed of the elements can (spirit, life, or heart) and demir (iron).

Surname 
 Adil Candemir (1917–1989), Turkish sport wrestler
 Koray Candemir (born 1975), Turkish musician, songwriter, and record producer

References 

Turkish masculine given names
Turkish-language surnames

de:Candemir